This is a list of the swimming national records for Tahiti. These are the fastest times ever swum by a swimmer representing Tahiti, for both long course (50m) and short course (25m) pools.

These records are kept by the Tahiti's national swimming federation: la Fédération Tahitienne de Natation (FTN).

The information below is based on a listing of the records posted on the website of the Tahitian club Cercle des Nageurs de Polynésie, based in Papeete where FTN is also based.

Long course (50 metres)

Men

Women

Mixed relay

Short course (25 metres)

Men

Women

References

External links
 FTN web site
 Tahitian Swimming Records - Men
 Tahitian Swimming Records - Women

Tahiti
Records